Aphomia variegatella is a species of snout moth in the genus Aphomia. It was described by entomologist George Hampson in 1901 and is known from Malaysia and Borneo.

References

Moths described in 1901
Tirathabini
Moths of Asia